Vaganov is a Russian toponymic masculine surname relating to a person living near the river Vaga, its feminine counterpart is Vaganova. Notable people with the surname include:
Agrippina Vaganova (1879–1951), Russian ballet teacher known for
Vaganova method
Vaganova Academy of Russian Ballet
Ekaterina Vaganova (born 1988), Russian dancer
Gennady Vaganov (born 1930), Soviet cross-country skier
Ilya Vaganov (born 1989), Russian footballer
Sergei Vaganov (born 1985), Russian footballer
Stepan Vaganov (1886–1918), Russian sailor and Bolshevik revolutionary

Fictional characters
Gleb Vaganov, a character from the Broadway adaptation of the 1997 film Anastasia

See also
Vaganova, Perm Krai, a village in Russia

References

Russian-language surnames